By Common Consent (BCC) is a group blog featuring commentary and discussion especially of Culture of The Church of Jesus Christ of Latter-day Saints, thought and current events. It was founded in 2004, and is one of several blogs in the group known as the Mormon Bloggernacle.  According to the blog's mission statement, BCC was founded "to provide a thoughtful, enjoyable, and reasonable place to post and discuss Mormon topics."

Name
The blog takes its name from an 1830 revelation given to the Church of Jesus Christ of Latter-day Saints founder Joseph Smith which instructed that "all things shall be done by common consent in the church, by much prayer and faith, for all things you shall receive by faith." This statement is now canonized as Doctrine and Covenants 26:2 of the Church of Jesus Christ of Latter-day Saints.

Although "By Common Consent" was used immediately as a working title for the blog, readers were asked to give suggestions on a permanent name. Suggested names included "The Rameumptom" (the original URL for the blog was rameumptom.blogspot.com  before moving to its present URL), "Zeezrom, Esq." (an homage to the heavy presence of legal professionals in the Mormon blogging community), "Cureloms & Cumoms", "By the Regular Sign" (a reference to the custom in the LDS Church to show support for a given proposition by raising the right hand), "Fifth Nephi" (a reference to the Book of Mormon's four books of Nephi, "Times & Seasons 2" (at the time BCC was established, Times & Seasons was the dominant Mormon blog), and "Pay On Gross" (a reference to a common debate among Mormons about whether tithes should be paid on net or gross income).

Content and style
Although By Common Consent was originally created to provide a place for more politically liberal members of the LDS Church to discuss issues, a vast majority of the content found on BCC is not political in nature. Post topics frequently address practical application of tenets of the LDS faith, Mormon history, analysis of ancient and modern scripture, poetry, music, humor, and current events.

New contributions to the blog are posted daily by the "permas" with frequent additional posts provided by guest bloggers. Comments from readers are supported, and while a majority of participants in comment discussions are adherents to the LDS Church, the blog aims to maintain an environment conducive to respectful interfaith dialogue. The blog includes articles and discussions, with scholarly research, satire, devotionals, and humor.

Recurring features

Since 2004, BCC has introduced several recurring features (* denotes series that is still active):
 Friday Firestorm: An open thread in which readers debate short passages taken from the scriptures or sermons from LDS Church leaders. These passages are typically presented out of context, so as to render the passage (possibly) more controversial or humorous than intended.
 The Illuminated Matsby*: A (typically humorous) digitally manipulated image by Matt Page blending Mormon culture, doctrine, history, and pop culture is presented without context or explanation as "an image of faith and devotion."
 Thursday Morning Quickie: An open thread in which readers debate short passages taken from an LDS youth program manual from 1956. The nature of the manual is such that all of the topics relate to dating, marriage, love, and related topics.
 The Top 10 LDS Musicians You've Never Heard Of: This is a series of guest posts from Arthur Hatton, a specialist in LDS music and founder of Linescratchers, a website which promotes new LDS musical artists who do not write or perform LDS music. The entries in this series focus on both the artistic and musical style of the featured musician and their life experiences.
 Police Beat Roundtable: According to the site, the Police Beat Roundtable, or "PBR" is "our ongoing look at that most charming column of The Daily Universe," the student newspaper of Brigham Young University. PBR takes the form of 4-6 contributors discussing humorous or awkward entries from the police reports of the campus newspaper. As of June 2010, there have been 21 editions of PBR, with Steve Evans serving as the host. Other regular or frequent participants include Ken Jennings, film critic Eric D. Snider, "GST" , and other bloggers from the Mormon blogging community.
 BCC Zeitcast*: The official podcast of By Common Consent. As of 2010, the BCC Zeitcast is in its 3rd Season. The podcast is available for download at BCC.
 You Make the Call: As explained by permablogger Kevin Barney in the first edition of You Make the Call:
"A friend reminded me of those old commercials featuring a close play in an NFL game, with the tag line You make the call!. The idea was for the TV viewer to pretend he is the referee and call the play how he sees it, and then compare the actual call the referee made in the game. So, in that spirit...this is a game where we examine a close play, and in the comments section of this blog, presumably without the benefit of guidance by the Spirit, we state our case for the call the official should make."

 Correlation: An Uncorrelated History: A series that details the cultural preconditions, emergence, historical development, and current configuration of the LDS Church's Correlation program.
 Theological Polls*: A poll is embedded in the blog presenting readers with a question, typically related to some obscure or speculative element of Mormon doctrine or policy. Often, respondents are forced to choose between awkwardly dichotomous or polemic answers.
 Church-Hacker*: Inspired by Lifehacker, a weekly "idea that you can try in your ward or calling to make the meeting block more engaging, more spiritual, or even more fun."

Contributors

Over the years, By Common Consent has featured a number of authors from the Latter-day Saint community. The contributors to the blog come from backgrounds including homemaking, law, history, social sciences, humanities, fine art, biology, chemistry, and computer science, among others. Religiously, the contributors represent "a varied swath of their lived religion," with different approaches to faith, doctrine, and religious living.  Additionally, several of the contributors write for other online or print publications on topics such as literature, politics, pop culture, and science.

 the asterisk (*) denotes original authors.

Current

Adam S. Miller
Aaron B.*
 a former Seattle attorney
Hodges B.
 Earned a master's degree in religious studies from Georgetown University. Works at the Neal A. Maxwell Institute for Religious Scholarship at BYU.
Brad Kramer
 , PhD candidate in sociocultural anthropology at the University of Michigan, with interests in semiotics, Marxist theory and Christian conversion. In 2010, contributed an article about early Mormon economics to Mormonism: A Historical Encyclopedia.
Cynthia L.
 A SAHM with PhD in Computer Science.
J. Stapley
 Chemist and executive at a startup firm; also independent historian of Mormonism and member of the editorial board of the Journal of Mormon History.
John C.
 Librarian and founder of another large Mormon blog called Faith Promoting Rumor.
Karen H.*
 Attorney in Washington D.C. working on international justice reform issues.

Kevin Barney
 Tax attorney, Mormon apologist, and expert in Biblical languages.
Kristine Haglund*
 Editor, Dialogue: A Journal of Mormon Thought. Current research: Mormon aesthetic theory and practice; history of Mormon women's publications, including blogs; Mormon women's and children's history; Mormon hymnody and children's songs. Lived in Massachusetts
Kyle M.
 Blogger, musician, advertising executive, former missionary in Finland.
Miles M.
 Writer, mother, former missionary in Russia.
M. Norbert Kilmer
 High school teacher in Europe.
Matt Page
 Graphic designer and artist.
Natalie B.
 Law student.
Rebecca J.
 Writer, mother.
Ronan JH
 Educator at a private school in Europe.
Russell Arben Fox
 Assoc. Prof. Political Science, Friends University in Wichita, Kansas, from 2006. BYU Studies Academy, member, Brigham Young University, 2006-2009. From 2008, Book Review Co-Editor, Dialogue

Sam MB
 Physician and medical researcher in Utah.
Scott B.
 Economist in Southern California and proud alumni of Utah State University.
Steve Evans*
 Principal founder of By Common Consent. Prolific commentator on Mormonism and new media, and, Mormonism and social memory. Wisconsin resident. Lived in Seattle with his family .
Steven P.
 Assoc. Prof., Dept. of Integrative Biology at Brigham Young University, from 2000,  teaching History and Philosophy of Biology and Bioethics. , had authored books, poetry, a novel and essays with Dialogue, Covenant, BYU Religious Studies Center, Irreantum, Amer. Tolkien Society, Newsweek and elsewhere.
Sunny Smart
Tracy M.
 Tracy McKay, writer, adult convert to the LDS church, graduate student at George Washington University (Fall 2012) and divorced mother of three. Keeps a personal blog at Dandelion Mama.
W.V. Smith
 Professor of Mathematics at Brigham Young University and independent historian. Author of Textual Studies of the Doctrine and Covenants: The Plural Marriage Revelation (Greg Kofford Books, 2018) and various historical articles.

Previous
*John C. Hamer independent researcher, historian, and mapmaker
Margaret Blair Young author and documentarian

Guests
BCC also features content produced by guest authors from the Latter-day Saints community, including the LDS sociologist Armand L. Mauss, LDS Biographer Gregory A. Prince, and parenting author Richard Eyre.  Additionally, By Common Consent periodically posts interviews with members of the LDS community, including an interview with comedian and author Elna Baker, and an interview with Michael Otterson, the Managing Director of Public Affairs for the LDS Church.

Awards
Since the initiation of the Bloggernacle’s annual "Niblet" awards in 2005, BCC has consistently won the award for "Best Big Blog." In 2009, BCC authors won the Niblets in the categories of "Best Overall Blogger," "Funniest Thread," "Best Humorous Post," "Best Historical Post," "Best Personal Post," "Best Doctrinal Post," "Best Current Events Post," "Best Podcast," "Best Book/Article Review," and "Best Contribution to the Bloggernacle."

Alliance with Dialogue
Several of the blog's long-term guest contributors are also editors or board members of Dialogue: A Journal of Mormon Thought. Kristine Haglund, one of BCC's permabloggers, is currently the Editor in Chief of Dialogue, while Ronan JH and Steven Peck, two other permabloggers, serve as Dialogue editors, and other current and former permabloggers contribute to the Dialogue editorial board.

BCC Press
The editors at By Common Consent inaugurated the non-profit book publisher BCC Press in April 2017, with the intent to publish books of Mormon-themed "philosophy, theology, history, scriptural exegesis, fiction, poetry, personal essays, and memoirs." Serving as president of the press is Steve Evans, attorney and popular Mormon blogger.

BCC Zeitcast

By Common Consent is also the home of the BCC Zeitcast, one of the Bloggernacle's few podcasts. Typically, the BCC Zeitcast is approximately 30 minutes in length, and takes the form of a talk radio, with anywhere from two to five contributors participating in a given episode. The podcast consists of a free flowing conversation on Bloggernacle meta-topics, popular culture, current events, religious topics, or news from the world of Mormonism.

The first BCC Zeitcast was posted on January 11, 2007, with subsequent episodes recorded and posted semi-regularly until Spring 2009. During this period, the primary contributors were permabloggers from BCC such as Steve Evans, Ronan JH, Amri Brown, and Brad Kramer, but would occasionally feature guests. The BCC Zeitcast returned in December 2009, with largely new permabloggers contributing to the new season.

See also
 Blogs about Mormons and Mormonism
 Culture of The Church of Jesus Christ of Latter-day Saints
 DezNat (Deseret Nation) (frequent critics of By Common Consent)
 List of blogs

References

External links
 
 
Multi-media
 
 Interview: Steve Evans and Steven Peck of BCC Press on the Provo Herald's April 11, 2017 'What Say Ye?' podcast

Blogs about Mormons and Mormonism
Internet properties established in 2004
21st-century American non-fiction writers